Carlos Pérez Suárez (born 14 July 1994) is a Mexican former professional boxer who competed from 2010 to 2013. He was promoted by Saúl Álvarez' company Canelo Promotions.

Amateur career
During his amateur career he had seventeen fights, going 16-1.

Professional career
In December 2010, Pérez beat the veteran Ivan Rodriguez at the Arena Jalisco in Guadalajara.

In his next fight Carlos lost against the veteran Cesar Figueroa on the Saúl Álvarez vs. Ryan Rhodes undercard.

References

External links

Boxers from Jalisco
Sportspeople from Guadalajara, Jalisco
Light-welterweight boxers
1994 births
Living people
Mexican male boxers